Luverne Senior High School is a high school located in Luverne, Minnesota, United States.  Luverne High School is the only public high school in Luverne.

References

Educational institutions established in 1878
Public high schools in Minnesota
Schools in Rock County, Minnesota
1878 establishments in Minnesota